Far Sector is a miniseries in the DC Comics Green Lantern franchise, published from 2019 to 2021 by DC's imprint DC's Young Animal. The Green Lantern of the series is Sojourner Mullein, created by science fiction and fantasy writer N. K. Jemisin. Far Sector won the 2022 Hugo Award for "Best Graphic Story or Comic".  Far Sector also received several more award nominations: three Eisner Awards nominations, a GLAAD Media Award for Outstanding Comic Book nomination, and an Ignyte Award. The series has an average critic rating of 8.7 out of 10 based on 169 reviews on the review aggregator website Comic Book Roundup.

References

Works by N. K. Jemisin
Hugo Award for Best Graphic Story-winning works